London, Midland and Scottish Railway (LMS) Stanier Class 5 4-6-0 No. 5110 (British Railways No. 45110) is a preserved British steam locomotive. It has carried the name RAF Biggin Hill in preservation, though it never carried this in service. Number 5110 was built in 1935 by the Vulcan Foundry. It was built with a low-degree superheat domeless boiler and still carries a domeless boiler.

Fifteen Guinea Special
The locomotive was one of three members of the class to haul the Fifteen Guinea Special, British Rail's last steam-hauled passenger train, on 11 August 1968. It took the first leg from Liverpool Lime Street to Manchester Victoria at the beginning of the tour before running from Manchester Victoria to Liverpool Lime Street with the returning train at the end of the day's tour. This locomotive was used in place of sister engine 45305, which had been selected for this duty, but had been failed with a collapsed firebox brick arch the night before the run, and had been withdrawn prematurely as a result.

Use in preservation
After hauling the Fifteen Guinea Special, 45110 was purchased straight from service for preservation by David Porter of the "Flairavia Flying Club" at Biggin Hill Airport. It moved temporarily to the former Ashford shed where it was named RAF Biggin Hall, and then to the Severn Valley Railway (SVR) in 1970; it was subsequently bought by the SVR in 1974, and has since been based at the line's locomotive depots at Bridgnorth and Bewdley.

Between 1994 and 1998, when the engine itself was undergoing a major overhaul at Bridgnorth, 45110's tender was used behind LMS Stanier Mogul 42968 (then in LMS livery as 2968), whilst its own Fowler tender had a twisted frame problem ironed out.

Following a return to service on 11 August 1998, the engine was main line registered, and did haul several main line steam specials on the national rail network, but after failing twice on a railtour to Stranraer in May 2000, the engine was confined to heritage rail operation only. It was hoped to have run 45110 on the 2008 recreation of the Fifteen Guinea Special, but this was not possible as the engine was due to come out of ticket on 11 August, the same day as the Fifteen Guinea Special re-run, and so a competition was offered by Steam Railway magazine to drive the engine on 11 August. Despite this, the engine was given an extension to its 10-year boiler ticket up to the end of August, at the end of which, the loco was withdrawn after 10 years of service.

In 2009–10, 45110 was placed on static display at Barrow Hill Engine Shed to take advantage of the available under cover storage. It was planned that the locomotive would remain at Barrow Hill for up to two years on loan from the Severn Valley Railway, which would see its return to the SVR in 2011–12, but in 2010 the engine's tender was recalled back to the SVR to be used once again behind 42968, after the 2-6-0's own tender developed wheelflats. 45110's tender remained in use behind 42968 until early 2012, when 42968 regained its own tender for the last year of its own 10 year boiler ticket, which expired in January 2013.

45110 returned to Bridgnorth on 30 September 2013, entering The Engine House at Highley on 6 October 2013 in place of 4930 Hagley Hall, which had just been moved to Bridgnorth for the start of a major overhaul. 45110 briefly left the Engine House in order to appear as a static exhibit at Kidderminster in August 2018 in an event marking 50 years since the end of BR steam, returning to the Engine House in September 2018. In March 2019 the locomotive was moved into store at Kidderminster.

References

External links 
 Railuk database
 Preserved locomotive database

45110
Preserved London, Midland and Scottish Railway steam locomotives
Individual locomotives of Great Britain
Railway locomotives introduced in 1935
Standard gauge steam locomotives of Great Britain